Tuonela Productions Ltd. is a game development and publishing company from Oulu, Northern Finland. Tuonela was founded in 2006. Tuonela produces both board games and digital games. They also distribute some other publishers' board games.

Tuonela was the first Finnish company to get their board game (The Club, 2008) distributed outside Europe. Tuonela's games ”The Club” (Published in 2008) and ”Modern Society” (2009) are distributed by Fred Distribution in the US, UK and Asia. In 2008 ”The Club” received noticeable attention in Finnish media since it was the most widely distributed Finnish board game at the time.

The Company's CEO Jussi Autio is also their main game designer. He has designed both ”The Club” and ”Modern Society”. He is also a candidate in the Finnish Parliament Election 2011.

Games by Tuonela

Board Games

Online Games

iPhone Games

References 
http://www.tuonelaproductions.com

http://www.savonsanomat.fi/viihde/viihdeuutiset/suomalainen-lautapeli-valloittaa-maailmaa/245393

http://www.iltalehti.fi/oulu/200810138346090_ou.shtml

http://www.lautapeliopas.fi/peliarvostelut/the-club/

http://boardgamegeek.com/boardgamepublisher/7322/tuonela-productions-ltd-

http://boardgamegeek.com/boardgamedesigner/9213/jussi-autio

http://www.jussiautio.com

http://www.fanen.com/brettspiele/1063_-1_-1_-1/katalog/1476325751/tuonela-productions-ltd.html?feuid=ef8d3b660dea99eb1bc8a6b7054aa720

http://www.spielbar.com/wordpress/2008/02/23/275

Board game publishing companies